"Confused" is a song by American singer Tevin Campbell. It was written and produced by Al B. Sure! and Kyle West for his debut studio album T.E.V.I.N. (1991). The song was released as the album's seventh single on October 29, 1992, reaching number 33 on the US Billboard Hot R&B/Hip-Hop Songs chart.

Track listings

Notes
 denotes additional producer

Credits and personnel
Credits lifted from the liner notes of T.E.V.I.N..

Tevin Campbell – background vocalist, lead vocalist
JoJo Hailey – background vocalist
K-Ci Hailey – background vocalist
Quincy Jones – executive producer

Benny Medina – executive producer
Al B. Sure! – background vocalist, lyrics, producer
Kyle West – lyrics, producer

Charts

References

Tevin Campbell songs
1991 songs
Songs written by Al B. Sure!
Warner Records singles
Songs written by Kyle West